Walter Head may refer to:

 Walter Woods (politician), born Walter Head, Australian politician
 Walter W. Head, American banker and insurance executive